Lila Dhar Barooah (1908-1973) was an Indian politician. He was a Member of Parliament, representing Assam in the Rajya Sabha, the upper house of India's Parliament as a member of the Indian National Congress.

References

Rajya Sabha members from Assam
Indian National Congress politicians
1908 births
People from Assam
1973 deaths
Indian National Congress politicians from Assam